Non-Chalcedonian Christianity comprises the branches of Christianity that do not accept theological resolutions of the Council of Chalcedon, the Fourth Ecumenical Council, held in 451. Non-Chalcedonian denominations reject the Christological Definition of Chalcedon (which asserted Dyophysitism), for varying reasons. Non-Chalcedonian Christianity thus stands in contrast to Chalcedonian Christianity.

Today, the Oriental Orthodox Churches predominantly comprise most of non-Chalcedonian Christianity.

Overview
The most substantial non-Chalcedonian tradition is known as Oriental Orthodoxy. Within this tradition are a number of ancient Christian churches including the Coptic Orthodox Church of Alexandria, the Syriac Orthodox Church (sometimes referred to as "Jacobite"), the Armenian Apostolic Church, the Ethiopian Orthodox Tewahedo Church, the Eritrean Orthodox Tewahedo Church and the Malankara Orthodox Syrian Church.

The Christology of the Church of the East (i.e., Nestorian Christianity) may be called "non-Ephesine" for not accepting the Council of Ephesus, but did finally gather to ratify the Council of Chalcedon at the Synod of Mar Aba I in 544.

Within the Patriarchates of Alexandria and Antioch, the rejection of the Chalcedonian definition became a cause of schism. While the common people of Egypt and Syria mostly objected to the Council, the Byzantine-Greek minority that formed the ruling class mostly accepted the Council. These two parties vied for possession of the ancient sees of Alexandria and Antioch that formed, at the time, the third and fourth most prestigious sees in Christendom, respectively. Ultimately, neither group absolutely dominated either church. The end result was the existence of two distinct patriarchates of Alexandria and Antioch for almost 1500 years, continuing in the present time. What is now known as the Coptic Orthodox Church of Alexandria is the native Egyptian patriarchal faction of Alexandria that reject Chalcedon, whereas the Greek Orthodox Church of Alexandria is composed of those who accept Chalcedon. For Syrians, the Syriac Orthodox Church forms the patriarchal faction of the native Syrian-Semitic population whereas the Greek Orthodox Church of Antioch is composed of those who accept Chalcedon.

In India and to a lesser degree in Persia, the schism that occurred was between the Oriental Orthodox and the Assyrian Church of the East. Even today in Kerala, there is a continuing presence of both the Assyrian Church of the East and the Syriac Orthodox Church along with an independent Oriental Orthodox Church called the Malankara Orthodox Syrian Church.

In the 18th century and onwards, Nontrinitarian and Unitarian Christians are necessarily non-Chalcedonian having their own separate traditions, different nontrinitarian theologies, and polities. The largest such groups are the Church of Jesus Christ of Latter-day Saints (Latter-day Saint movement), Jehovah's Witnesses and the Iglesia ni Cristo.

See also
Conference of Addis Ababa

References

Sources

 
 
 
 
 
 
 
 
 
 
 
 
 
 
 
 
 
 
 
 
 

Christian theological movements
Nature of Jesus Christ